Nanakpanthis (Gurmukhi: ਨਾਨਕਪੰਥੀ; nānakapathī) is a Sikh sect which refers to followers of the teachings of Guru Nanak (1469-1539), the foundational guru of a spiritual community natively known as Nanakpanth while known world-wide as Sikhism. Nanakpanth is an open frontier that references strongly an early Sikh community. Nanakpanthi signifies any person, regardless of any religious affiliation, who follows Guru Nanak and believes in his teachings of Universal brotherhood, Truth, Love, Tolerance, Compassion and most importantly Oneness of one single formless Waheguru (The creator of whole Universe).

Today a large fraction of the Punjabi Hindus, Sindhi Hindus, and Pashtun Hindus consider themselves not simply as Hindus, but more precisely as Nanakpanthis, both in Pakistan and in India. Strands of Nanakpanthi culture exists in Pakistan and Afghanistan including Balochistan, Sindh, Khyber Pakhtunkhwa and remote areas of Punjab province. They generally do not sport beards or wear a turban unlike Amritdhari Sikhs. Even in the 1881 and 1891 Indian censuses, the Sindhi Hindu community could not decide to collectively identify as Hindu or Sikh. In the later 1911 Census Report, Shahpur District (Punjab) reported that 20,539 Hindus (being 34 percent of the total Hindu population) identified as Nanakpanthi along with 78,016 Sikhs (being 38 percent of the total Sikh population). There is no data for the specific number of Nanakpanthis. Karnail Singh Panjoli, member of the Shiromani Gurdwara Prabandhak Committee, says that there are several communities within the term ‘Nanakpanthis’ too. There are groups like Sikhligarh, Vanjaarey, Radha Soami, Nirmaley, Namdhari, Lubaney, Johri, Satnamiye, Udaasiyas, Punjabi Hindus, Sindhi Hindus, and Punjabi Muslims who call themselves Nanakpanthis. They along with their religious affiliated books, follow and incorporate the teachings of Guru Nanak. Within India, Nanakpanthis are well scattered across states like Assam, Tripura, West Bengal, Odisha, Bihar, Rajasthan, Maharashtra, Madhya Pradesh, Uttar Pradesh, Jharkhand, Chhattisgarh, Himachal Pradesh, Delhi and Haryana etc.”

Worldwide there are estimated 25–30 million Khalsa Sikhs who solely identify their religious affiliation as "Sikh". However, there are in addition many millions of people (around 120-150 million approx.) across the world who also venerate the 10 Sikh Gurus and follow the teachings of Guru Granth Sahib. Amritsar is the holiest city in Sikhism and about 120 million people from across the world visit it each year for pilgrimage.

Various number of Ethnicities/sects in India follow  the teachings of Guru Nanak and visit gurudwaras along with worshipping Hindu deities at Mandirs. The Indian government considers them as Hindus in the official census. Many Sindhi Hindus in both India and Pakistan believe in Guru Nanak and visit gurudwaras regularly. A major segment of ethnic Punjabis who are Hindu by religion especially in Indian Punjab, Pakistan's Punjab, Delhi, Haryana, Rajasthan, Chandigarh, Jammu and Uttarakhand etc have continued heterogeneous religious practices in spiritual kinship with Sikhism. This not only includes veneration of the Sikh Gurus in private practice but also visit to Sikh Gurdwaras in addition to Hindu Mandirs.

Gallery

See also
 Sadh Belo
 Sindh
 Sects of Sikhism

References

Sikh groups and sects
Hindu denominations

Sikhism in Pakistan
Hinduism in Pakistan
Sant Mat